The 2014 All-Japan Rugby Football Championship (日本ラグビーフットボール選手権大会 Nihon Ragubi-Futtobo-ru Senshuken Taikai) took place from February 16 up to the final on March 9.

Qualifying

Top League
The top four teams (Panasonic Wild Knights, Suntory Sungoliath, Kobelco Steelers, Toshiba Brave Lupus) in the 2013–14 Top League automatically qualified for the competition, and competed in a playoff competition.

Panasonic Wild Knights and Suntory Sungoliath eventually played in the Final, with Panasonic Wild Knights winning 45-22. As Top League finalists they gained automatic entry to the Championship Semi-finals.

The Top League Wildcard Tournament was contested by the fifth to twelfth teams in the final table for the last two places for this league in the Championship. These places were eventually taken by Toyota Verblitz and Yamaha Júbilo.

University 
In the 50th Japan National University Rugby Championship final Teikyo University defeated Waseda University 41-34. Both teams gained entry to the Championship as finalists, the two beaten semi-finalists Keio University and Tsukuba University also qualified.

Qualifying Teams 

 Top League Playoff Finalists - Panasonic Wild Knights, Suntory Sungoliath
 Top League Playoff Semi-Finalists - Kobelco Steelers, Toshiba Brave Lupus
 Top League Wild Card Playoff - Yamaha Júbilo, Toyota Verblitz
 All Japan University Rugby Championship - Teikyo University, Waseda University
 All Japan University Rugby Championship Semi-Finalists - Keio University, Tsukuba University

Knockout stages

First round

Quarter-final

Semi-final 

Panasonic Wild Knights and Suntory Sungoliath bypassed the first two rounds into the semi-finals by reaching the final of the Top League playoffs in 2015.

Final

See also 
 All-Japan Rugby Football Championship
 Rugby Union in Japan

References

2013–14 in Japanese rugby union
All-Japan Rugby Football Championship